Bobo Cop is a 1988 Filipino action comedy film directed by Tony Y. Reyes and starring Joey Marquez as the titular cop, alongside Alice Dixson, Matet, Kristina Paner, Cris Villanueva, Atoy Co, Amy Perez, Willy Revillame, Panchito and Cachupoy. The film's title is in reference to the 1987 American film RoboCop. Produced by Regal Films, Bobo Cop was released in May 1988.

Critic Lav Diaz gave the film a mildly positive review, commending it for being hilarious despite its imitation of numerous screen works such as Police Academy and The Six Million Dollar Man while criticizing the third act for being boring.

Cast

Joey Marquez as Renato Dalmacio
Alice Dixson as Louise
Matet
Kristina Paner
Cris Villanueva
Atoy Co
Amy Perez
Willy Revillame
Panchito as Renato's godfather
Palito
Cachupoy
Berting Labra
Max Alvarado as the professor
Paquito Diaz
Balot
Jaime Castillo
Marilyn Villamayor
Carmina Villaruel
Jenny Lyn
Robert Ortega
Smokey Manaloto
Marissa Delgado
Boy Alano
Tony Carreon as Doctor Gracia
Rudy Meyer
Don Pepot as Badong
Vangie Labalan as Maring
Jack Fajardo
Larry Silva
Metring David
Perry de Guzman

Release
Bobo Cop was released in May 1988.

Critical response
Lav Diaz, writing for the Manila Standard, gave Bobo Cop a mildly positive review. He stated that though the film tried to cram as many imitations as it can into the story, from Police Academy to The Six Million Dollar Man to Jimmy Wang Yu, it was still able to garner effective hilarity. Diaz criticized, however, the film for becoming boring when it became a parody of RoboCop in the third act.

References

External links

1988 films
1988 comedy films
Filipino-language films
Films about police officers
Philippine action comedy films
Philippine comedy films
Philippine science fiction comedy films